Kadaka is a village in Lääneranna Parish, Pärnu County, in southwestern Estonia, on the coast of the Gulf of Riga. It has only 7 inhabitants (as of 1 January 2011).

References

Villages in Pärnu County